Emmanuel Nosakhare Igiebor (born 9 November 1990), commonly known as Nosa Igiebor or Nosa, is a Nigerian footballer who plays as a midfielder. He was called up to Nigeria's 23-man squad for the 2013 Africa Cup of Nations.

Club career
After appearing in his homeland with Sharks and Warri Wolves, Nosa joined Tippeligaen side Lillestrøm in 2009. He held a starting spot during his time in Norway, being an important offensive unit in the 2011 campaign, netting eight times in 17 matches.

On 8 August 2011, Nosa signed for Hapoel Tel Aviv, for transfer fee of 8 million krones. On 18 August 2011, he made his debut in Hapoel during the Europa League Playoffs against FK Ekranas. Four days later he scored his first goal for Hapoel against Maccabi Petah-Tikva. On 14 May 2012, Nosa scored the winning goal in the Israeli cup final in a 2–1 victory over Maccabi Haifa.

On 24 August 2012, Nosa moved to Spain for a transfer fee of 1.2 million euro, signing a four-year deal with Real Betis. On 12 April 2013, he scored his first goal in Betis against Sevilla FC after coming on as a substitute in the 89th minute. He finished his two seasons in Betis with 2 goals in 28 appearances.

On 22 July 2014, Nosa joined Maccabi Tel-Aviv. On 30 July 2014, he made his debut in Maccabi in a 1–0 loss to Maribor during the Champions League Qualifiers.

On 8 September 2017, Vancouver Whitecaps FC announced that Nosa had been signed for the remainder of the 2017 season, with club options for 2018 and 2019.

Honours

Club

Hapoel Tel Aviv
Israel State Cup: 2011-12

Maccabi Tel Aviv
Israeli Premier League: 2014–15
Israel State Cup: 2014-15
Toto Cup: 2014–15

References

External links
  

1990 births
Living people
Association football midfielders
Nigerian footballers
Eliteserien players
Expatriate footballers in Norway
Lillestrøm SK players
Hapoel Tel Aviv F.C. players
Real Betis players
Maccabi Tel Aviv F.C. players
Çaykur Rizespor footballers
Vancouver Whitecaps FC players
Nigerian expatriate footballers
Sharks F.C. players
Nigerian expatriate sportspeople in Norway
People from Abuja
Warri Wolves F.C. players
2011 CAF U-23 Championship players
2013 Africa Cup of Nations players
Israeli Premier League players
Süper Lig players
Major League Soccer players
Africa Cup of Nations-winning players
Cypriot First Division players
La Liga players
Nigeria international footballers